Old Cooperative House of Ranković Family is located in Draževac, a settlement in the territory of the city municipality of Obrenovac. The building is listed as a cultural monument.

Description 
Old Cooperative House of Ranković Family in Draževac is typical of houses built in Šumadija and central Serbia. It is a rural cooperative house built by a wealthy family in the first half of the 19th century.

Description 
The house has a square foundation of 15 x 15 m, built using oak beams placed upon a stone base. The walls are brick and rubble construction and the roof is tiled. The front porch is deep with a four-arch arcade, and is protected by a wooden half-wall added later. Inside, four rooms are arranged around a central hall. The windows are aligned in a marked horizontal pattern. The large roof eaves are artistically designed.

The house was moved to its present location near the primary school in Draževac in the 1980s.

References 

19th century in Belgrade
Buildings and structures in Belgrade
History of Belgrade
Houses completed in the 19th century
Houses in Serbia
Obrenovac
Wooden houses